This article lists Canadian federal and provincial electoral districts with the name Okanagan, or in the Okanagan region.

Current federal electoral districts

 Okanagan—Shuswap (2004 - )
 Okanagan—Coquihalla (1996 - )
 British Columbia Southern Interior (2004 - )
 Kelowna—Lake Country (1997 - )
 Central Okanagan—Similkameen—Nicola (2013 -)

Defunct federal electoral districts

 Kootenay—Boundary—Okanagan (1998 - 2003)
 North Okanagan—Shuswap (1996 - 1997),  (2003 - 2004)
 Okanagan Boundary (1952 - 1976)
 Okanagan Centre (1987 - 1996)
 Okanagan North (1976 - 1987)
 Okanagan—Kootenay (1966 - 1976)
 Okanagan—Revelstoke  (1952 - 1966)
 Okanagan—Shuswap  (1987 - 1996), (1997 - 2003)
 Okanagan—Similkameen  (1976 - 1987)
 Okanagan—Similkameen—Merritt (1987 - 1996)
 West Kootenay—Okanagan (1996 - 1998)
 Southern Interior (2003-2004)

Current provincial electoral districts

 Okanagan-Vernon
 Penticton-Okanagan Valley
 Kelowna-Mission
 Kelowna-Lake Country
 Westside-Kelowna

Defunct provincial electoral districts

 Yale (1871-1890)
 Yale-East (1894-1900)
 Similkameen (1903-1963)
 Boundary-Similkameen (1966-1988)
 Okanagan-Boundary (1991-1996)
 West Kootenay-Boundary (current riding, 2001-)
 Yale-North (1894-1900)
 Shuswap
 Kamloops
 Okanagan
 North Okanagan
 Okanagan North
 Okanagan-Vernon
 South Okanagan
 Okanagan South
 Okanagan-Penticton
 Okanagan-Westside

References
Electoral History of BC, BC Elections

British Columbia electoral districts
Okanagan